In Greek mythology, Alcyoneus or Alkyoneus  (Alkuoneus)  was a young and handsome man from Krisa (ancient name of Delphi), only son of Diomos and Meganeira.

Mythology
The inhabitants of Delphoi asked the oracle of Apollo on what to do about the menace of the drakaina Sybaris, who terrorized the region from the Mount Cirphis. The god told them that they would be freed from this threat if they delivered a youth they chose in the monster's cave.

So they did. By lot Alcyoneus was chosen. The boy possessed beauty both in appearance and in the nature of his character. The priests crowned Alcyoneus and took him to the cave of Sybaris.

By divine inspiration, Eurybarus son of Euphemos and a descendant of the river god Axios, a young man but brave, happened to be coming from Kouretis and encountered the young and handsome Alcyoneus as he was being led to the cave of the drakaina on Mount Cirphis to be sacrificed. Eurybarus fell in love at first sight with Alcyoneus and asked why he was being taken to the cave. When he learned their purpose Eurybarus realized that he could not allow the youth to perish so wretchedly. Tearing off the wreath from Alcyoneus' head, Eurybarus placed it on his own head and gave orders that he himself should be led forward instead of Alcyoneus.

As soon as he entered the cavern, Eurybarus ran and dragged Sybaris from her den, taking her out and tossing her off the crags. The drakaina struck her head against the footings of Krisa and she faded from sight. From that rock sprang a fountain and the locals call it Sybaris.

Note

References 

Antoninus Liberalis, The Metamorphoses of Antoninus Liberalis translated by Francis Celoria (Routledge 1992). Online version at the Topos Text Project.

Greek mythological heroes
Phocian characters in Greek mythology
Mythology of Phocis
LGBT themes in Greek mythology